Zuhayr ibn Janab ibn Hubal al-Kalbi was a chieftain of the Banu Kalb tribe and a pre-Islamic Arabic warrior poet. Much of his biography relies on semi-legendary accounts, but it is apparent that he lived in the early 6th century. He led not only the Kalb, but the entire Quda'a tribal confederation. During his one-time alliance with the Aksumite viceroy Abraha, Zuhayr quelled a revolt by the Taghlib and Bakr tribes, capturing their chieftains, including Kulayb ibn Rabi'a. Later, he destroyed the pagan sanctuary of the Ghatafan tribe, which rivaled the Ka'aba in Mecca. Traditional Arab sources noted that Zuhayr lived an extremely long life, and finally died by suicide after he was disobeyed. His descendants, particularly those belonging to the family of Bahdal ibn Unayf, would later hold high positions under the Umayyad Caliphate.

Life
Zuhayr's genealogy, as cited by Ibn Abd Rabbih, is Zuhayr ibn Janāb ibn Hubal ibn ʿAbd Allāh ibn Kināna. He belonged to the Banu Kalb tribe, and served as one of the group's main chieftains. According to some ancient or medieval Arab sources, Zuhayr was also the leader of the entire Quda'a confederation, which included the Bedouin tribes of Kalb, Juhayna, Bali, al-Qayn, Bahra' and Tanukh. Under Zuhayr's leadership, the Kalb also formed a close alliance with the Amilah tribe. Zuhayr is recorded as one of the muʿammarūn (centenarians) and he was noted in Arab legends for his extremely long life. According to these fables, Zuhayr lived to 450 years of age, and his grandfather Hubal lived to 650.

Sometime in the early or mid-6th century, Zuhayr was a one-time ally of Abraha (d. ca. 553), the Aksumite viceroy of Yemen and enemy of the Meccans. Abraha gave Zuhayr authority over the related tribes of Taghlib and Banu Bakr. He led an attack by the Kalb and their Yemeni allies against the two tribes when they revolted, and took captive the Taghlibi chieftain Kulayb ibn Rabi'a and his brother Muhalhil. In his poetry, Zuhayr refers to this battle, which is recorded by many traditional Arab sources, saying "We captured Muhalhil and his brother ... May Taghlib perish because their women are herded to the market like slaves with no ornaments". After the battle, the Amilah persuaded Zuhayr to release Muhalhil and noblemen from the Bakr tribe.

Later, friendly relations apparently existed between Zuhayr and the Meccans, including the tribe of Quraysh. When the Ghatafan tribe constructed a haram (religious sanctuary) for their idols at a place called "Buss" to rival the Ka'aba in Mecca, Zuhayr resolved to destroy it. Accounts vary as to Zuhayr's motive, with some holding that the erection of the haram offended Zuhayr because it implied Ghatafani superiority over his own tribe, and others claiming that it was a favor by Zuhayr to the Quraysh in Mecca. The former account is supported by 10th-century historian Abu al-Faraj al-Isfahani, who wrote that when Zuhayr became aware of the Ghatafan's action, he exclaimed "By God, that will never happen while I am alive! I will never leave Ghatafan alone while they take a haram". Following this, Zuhayr gathered his Kalbi tribesmen, raided and defeated the Ghatafan in their dwelling place and destroyed their haram. Afterward, "he acted graciously toward Ghatafan", releasing their women and cattle.

Legacy
Zuhayr is said have killed himself by drinking unmixed wine after being disobeyed. His legend and prestige continued to hold great significance for the Kalb and the entire Quda'a confederation until at least the 8th century, i.e. two centuries into the Islamic era. Among his descendants were the Banu Haritha ibn Janab clan, whose genealogy is traced to Zuhayr as: Ḥaritha ibn Janāb ibn Qays ibn Imruʾ al-Qays ibn Jābir ibn Zuhayr ibn Janāb. Many of the clan's members played prominent roles in early Islamic history. These included the offspring of Bahdal ibn Unayf (d. 650s), such as his daughter Maysun, who married Caliph Mu'awiyah I (r. 661–680) and gave birth to the latter's son and successor Yazid I (r. 680–683). Bahdal's grandsons Hassan (d. 668), Humayd and Sa'id, also played leading roles over the Kalb and in the Umayyad court and military. Other notable members of the Banu Haritha ibn Janab included al-Fahl ibn Ayyash, who reportedly slew Yazid ibn al-Muhallab in 720, and the poet al-Musayyab ibn Rifall.

References

Bibliography

6th-century Arabic poets
Banu Kalb
Bedouin tribal chiefs